Phacelia tanacetifolia is a species of flowering plant in the borage family Boraginaceae, known by the common names lacy phacelia, blue tansy or purple tansy.

Etymology
Phacelia is derived from Greek and means 'bundle', in reference to the clustered flowers, while tanacetifolia means 'with leaves resembling those of Tanacetum.'

Description
Phacelia tanacetifolia is an annual that grows erect to a maximum height near  with none to a few branches. The wild form is glandular and coated in short stiff hairs. The leaves, are mostly divided into smaller leaflets which are deeply and intricately cut into toothed lobes, giving them a lacy appearance. The dense and hairy inflorescence is a one-sided curving or coiling cyme of bell-shaped flowers in shades of blue and lavender. Each flower is just under a centimeter long and has protruding whiskery stamens.

The seeds are "negatively photoblastic", or photodormant, and will only germinate in darkness.

Range and uses

Beneficial insects
Phacelia tanacetifolia is native to the Southwestern United States and northwestern Mexico. It is most common in the deserts of southern California at elevations below , but may be occasionally found at much higher elevations.

It is used outside its native range in agriculture as a cover crop, a bee plant, an attractant for other beneficial insects, as a green manure and an ornamental plant. It is planted in vineyards and alongside crop fields, where it is valued for its long, coiling inflorescences of nectar-rich flowers which open in sequence, giving a long flowering period. It is a good insectary plant, attracting pollinators such as bumblebees and honey bees.

Biological pest control
It is also attractive to hoverflies (family Syrphidae), which are useful as biological pest control agents because they eat aphids and other pests.

References

External links

Photo gallery
Photo - Bees love Phacelia Flowers

tanacetifolia
Flora of California
Flora of Baja California
Flora of Arizona
Flora of Nevada
Flora of the California desert regions
Natural history of the California chaparral and woodlands
Natural history of the California Coast Ranges
Natural history of the Mojave Desert
Natural history of the Peninsular Ranges
Natural history of the San Francisco Bay Area
Natural history of the Santa Monica Mountains
Natural history of the Transverse Ranges
Flora without expected TNC conservation status